Bình Sơn Pagoda (Vietnamese: Tháp Bình Sơn) is an 11-story terra cotta pagoda at the Vinh Khanh Temple in Vinh Phuc province, Vietnam. It was built under the Tran Dynasty and said to consist of 15 storeys in its original form. The pagoda is one of the ten outstanding old architectural works along with notable ones such as the One-Pillar Pagoda. At 16.5 metres, it is the highest Tran Dynasty terra cotta pagoda surviving until today.

References

Pagodas in Vietnam